Hongdae is a neighborhood in Seoul, South Korea near Hongik University, after which it is named. It is known for its urban arts and indie music culture, local shops, clubs and entertainment. The area is located in Mapo-gu in the western end of Seoul, stretching from Seogyo-dong to Hapjeong-dong.

Name
Hongdae is a portmanteau of Hongik Daehakgyo, Hongik University (홍익대학교). The term 'hongdae' is usually used in regards to Hongik University which has one of the top fine arts colleges in South Korea.

Characteristics

Under the influence of Hongik University (Hongdae) which is well known for its prestigious art college, the neighborhood was built on a foundation of artistic souls since the 1990s. In the early days, thanks to then-cheap rent, budget musicians and street artists started moving into the ateliers of the Hongdae area. In the true sense of the word, the Korean indie scene started from the two bands, Sister's Barbershop and Crying Nut at Hongdae in the mid-1990s. Before that many cover bands were playing near Shinchon and Idae. Later, other bands like Jaurim, Peppertones and Idiotape started to play at venues in Hongdae, and the area begins to have a reputation as the mecca of urban arts and underground club culture. Now the area provides street art festivals and performances, as well as music concerts by independent artists and mainstream entertainers.

Many come to Hongdae for its aesthetically unique characteristics. There are many graffiti murals painted all over the streets of Hongdae. One of the well known areas for these murals is Hongdae Mural Street (also known as ‘Picasso's Street’).

Like other multi-cultural metropolitan areas, this street is undergoing gentrification. However, despite the recent explosion of upmarket brand shops that pushes artists to move toward the southern area near Hapjeong Station, 
the street still enjoys a reputation as the city's prime spot for indie musicians. Many live music venues and festivals draw revelers from a wide range of visitors. 
YG Entertainment, the major K-pop agency is also located near the street.

Apart from indie art culture, Hongdae is also home to independent clothing stalls and vintage shops. As well, there are kitschy and eclectic theme cafes for characters and pets. In 2016, Hongdae was ranked one of the coolest neighborhoods in the world.

Events

Zandari Festa

Zandari Festa is named after 'Zandari', an old name for the Hongdae area. 'Zandari' implies small bridge, and the festival's ambition is also to be a bridge between the artists and audiences around the local indie music scene. Every Fall, it is held over 3 days in the pre-scheduled hosting live clubs. The festival encourages bands to invite themselves, artists are also encouraged to take part in planning and promoting the shows they play in.

Live Club Day
Since March 2001, 'Club Day' started as a wristband-powered event which allows entry to more than a dozen clubs for the price of one.
After 2007, 'Sound Day' also launched together with the indie music concert venues.
During 2008 through early 2009 they were suspend due to high levels of violence and disturbances by US Army soldiers and underage individuals.
They reopened again but came to close soon in January 2011 (as the 117th Club Day), mainly due to the dispute over the distribution of profits between popular live/dance clubs and other budget ones.

After a four-year break, in January 2015, six live clubs established the 'Live Club Cooperative' and with other clubs, they resumed the 'Live Club Day' on 27 February.
The 'Live Club Day' is held on the last Friday of every month. 
The ticket system is the same as before, one can get access to multiple clubs for a variety of genres including rock, jazz, hip hop and electronic with one ticket.

Street Art Exhibition

During early 1990s, students from the College of Fine Arts at Hongik University began to decorate the streets, walls, and roads around the college.
Their efforts were soon joined by many artists from across the country and the first 'Street Art Festival' was held in 1993.
Every year, students of Hongik University and neighbor artists join to produce diversity of visual arts on Hongdae streets like graffiti wall painting, installation arts and performances.

Free Market
'Hongdaeap Artmarket Freemarket' is held on 'Hongdae Playground', that is in front of the main gate of Hongik University.
It holds on weekends, from March to November at 13:00 to 18:00
by the host of the nonprofit organization 'Living and Art Creative Center (일상예술창작센터)' since 2002.
The flea markets are called "Free Market" on Saturdays and "Hope Market" on Sundays. They are fledgling craft markets of things made by students and street artists.
Other culture markets have been influenced by this original playground Freemarket and open randomly around the Hongdae area.

Transport 
The area is served by subway via Hongik University station (and ), 
Hapjeong station ( and ), 
and Sangsu station. Also, various Seoul bus lines reach the street, as well as the presence of many taxis.

In popular culture
Hongdae area is widely used for filming location of domestic television dramas and movies, which include :
 2007, MBC's Coffee Prince'
 2010, KBS's Mary Stayed Out All Night 2011, tvN's Flower Boy Ramyun Shop.
 2012, SBS's A Gentleman's Dignity.
 2015, Belgian singer-songwriter Sioen made a song named Hongdae.
 2017, Mnet's reality show Fromis's Room 2018, JTBC's reality show Blackpink House''
2021, 1theK's reality show Learn Way season 2, Episode 9

Gallery

References

External links
 Zandari Festa Official Homepage
 Live Club Day
 Hongdaeap Freemarket Official Homepage
  Street Art Exhibition

Neighbourhoods of Mapo District
Entertainment districts in South Korea
Shopping districts and streets in South Korea
Tourist attractions in Seoul
Hongik University